KINYRAS is a domestic submarine telecommunications cable system in the Mediterranean Sea along the coast of Cyprus.

It has landing points in:
 Geroskipou/Yeroskipos (Greek: Γεροσκήπου), Paphos District (Greek:Επαρχία Πάφου)
 Pentaskhios

It has a design transmission capacity of 6 x 2.5 Gbit/s and a total cable length of 140 km.  It started operation in 1994.

References
 
 KINYRAS, Greg's Cable Map

Submarine communications cables in the Mediterranean Sea
1994 establishments in Cyprus